Alexander Robert Herbert (March 28, 1914 – June 18, 1960) was a Canadian politician who was a Member of Provincial Parliament in Legislative Assembly of Ontario from 1951 to 1960. He represented the riding of Simcoe Centre for the Ontario Progressive Conservative Party. Born in Haileybury, Ontario, he was a businessman. Herbert died in office in 1960 of a heart attack.

References

1914 births
1960 deaths
People from Temiskaming Shores
Progressive Conservative Party of Ontario MPPs